The Players Championship Finals is a darts tournament organised by the Professional Darts Corporation. The tournament originally featured the top 32 players from the Players Championship Order of Merit, a separate ranking system that only takes into account the non-televised Players Championship events on the PDC Pro Tour. In 2016, the field increased to 64 players.

The tournament was first announced at the PDC Awards Dinner in January 2008 by PDC chairman Barry Hearn. It was initially held from late January to February, and originally took place at the Circus Tavern in Purfleet, the venue for the first 14 PDC World Championships. For the third edition, the event moved to the Doncaster Dome. The 2012 edition took place in December at Butlins Minehead and has remained at that venue for all subsequent tournaments, with the exception of the 2020 tournament, which was moved to Coventry, due to the COVID-19 pandemic.

Finals

Records and statistics

Total finalist appearances

 Active players are shown in bold
 Only players who reached the final are included
 In the event of identical records, players are sorted in alphabetical order by family name

Champions by country

Nine-dart finishes
Three nine-darters have been thrown at the Players Championship Finals. The first one was in 2016, which is the only one of the three that wasn't done on the Main Stage.

High averages

Television coverage
In the UK and Ireland, the first two tournaments were broadcast on ITV4 with the third edition being screened by PDC TV. The fourth edition returned to ITV4 where it has stayed ever since and ITV4 signed a long-term deal to cover the European Championships, Players Championships, UK Open and new tournament the Masters from 2014 to 2016.

TV broadcasters
 2009–2010: ITV4
 February 2011: PDC TV
 December 2011–present: ITV4

References

External links
Official website
Players Championship Finals on Darts Database

 
Professional Darts Corporation tournaments
Darts in England
Recurring sporting events established in 2009
2009 establishments in England
Annual sporting events in the United Kingdom